Disa railway station is a railway station in Banaskantha district, Gujarat, India on the Western line of the Western Railway network. Passenger, Express and Superfast trains halt here.

Nearby Stations

Lorwada is nearest railway station towards , whereas Chandisar is nearest railway station towards .

Major trains

Following Express and Superfast trains halt at Disa railway station in both direction:

 19151/52 Palanpur–Bhuj Intercity Express
 14805/06 Yesvantpur–Barmer AC Express
 14803/04 Bhagat Ki Kothi–Ahmedabad Weekly Express
 14321/22 Ala Hazrat Express (via Bhildi)
 12959/60 Dadar–Bhuj Superfast Express

References 

Railway stations in Banaskantha district
Ahmedabad railway division